Soghomon is an Armenian given name and may refer to:
 Soghomon Tehlirian, the man who killed Talaat Pasha
 Komitas (Soghomon Gevorkevich Soghomonyan)